Suhrid Mitra (23 November 1921 – 24 February 1993) was an Indian cricketer. He played four first-class matches for Bengal between 1939 and 1945.

See also
 List of Bengal cricketers

References

1921 births
1993 deaths
Indian cricketers
Bengal cricketers
Cricketers from Kolkata